Pachylocerus sulcatus is a species of beetle in the family Cerambycidae. It is found in Southeast Asia from northeastern India to Vietnam.

References

Cerambycinae